Razorback Mountain is located on the border of Alberta and British Columbia. It was named in 1915 for the narrow ridge on the mountain.

See also
 List of peaks on the Alberta–British Columbia border
 Mountains of Alberta
 Mountains of British Columbia

References

Razorback Mountain
Razorback Mountain
Canadian Rockies